Leumicamia is a genus of moths of the family Noctuidae described by Pierre Viette in 1965.

Species
 Leumicamia graminicolens (Butler, 1878)
 Leumicamia illustris Laporte, 1977
 Leumicamia leucosoma (Felder & Rogenhofer, 1874)
 Leumicamia oreias (D. S. Fletcher, 1959)
 Leumicamia palustris Laporte, 1976
 Leumicamia venustissima (Laporte, 1974)

References

Hadeninae